Colin Whitaker (14 July 1932 – 1 May 2015) was an English footballer who played as a left winger in the Football League.

Biography
Whitaker was a member of the youth team at Leeds United, before joining Sheffield Wednesday during the 1951–52 season. After only one league appearance for Wednesday he signed for Bradford Park Avenue. He went on to play for five other Football League clubs, Shrewsbury Town, Queens Park Rangers, Rochdale, Oldham Athletic and Barrow.

In 1964 he dropped into non-League football, signing for Ashton United. He joined Buxton during the 1965–66 season, and also played for Heanor Town and Stalybridge Celtic, where he was player-manager. He later managed Buxton for two spells between December 1970 and January 1982, in between which he managed Droylsden.

He also played cricket for Shropshire in the 1958 Minor Counties Championship. He died on 1 May 2015.

References

1932 births
2015 deaths
English footballers
Footballers from Leeds
Association football midfielders
Oldham Athletic A.F.C. players
Sheffield Wednesday F.C. players
Bradford (Park Avenue) A.F.C. players
Shrewsbury Town F.C. players
Queens Park Rangers F.C. players
Rochdale A.F.C. players
Barrow A.F.C. players
Ashton United F.C. players
Buxton F.C. players
Heanor Town F.C. players
Stalybridge Celtic F.C. players
English Football League players
English cricketers
Shropshire cricketers
English football managers
Stalybridge Celtic F.C. managers
Buxton F.C. managers
Droylsden F.C. managers